Portrait of Victorine Meurent is an 1862 oil on canvas painting by Édouard Manet, now in the Boston Museum of Fine Arts. It shows Victorine Meurent aged 18, also shown by Manet in his The Street Singer a few months later

The earliest photographs of the work by the Rosenberg Foundation show a signature, but the work cannot be found in the posthumous inventory or sale of Manet's works. It was recorded in Glasgow in the home of the shipping merchant and philanthropist William Burrell before returning to France in 1905 on its acquisition by the Galerie Bernheim-Jeune. It was later found in Alphonse Kahn's collection in Saint-Germain-en-Laye before being bought by Paul Rosenberg and then entering Robert Treat Paine's collection. Paine was a trustee of the Boston Museum of Fine Arts, to which the work was left by his son Richard C. Paine in 1946.

References

Bibliography
 
 Adolphe Tabarant, Manet et ses œuvres, Paris, Gallimard, 1947, 600 p.
 Adolphe Tabarant, Les Manet de la collection Havemeyer : La Renaissance de l'art français, Paris, 1930, XIII éd.

Meurent
1862 paintings
Meurent
Paintings in the collection of the Museum of Fine Arts, Boston